Schuylkill Friends Meeting House is a Quaker meeting house located on North Whitehorse Road in the Schuylkill Township section of Chester County, Pennsylvania, in the United States. This Meeting House is 2.5 miles west of the Valley Forge Post Office.

Originally Charlestown Friends Meeting, the name was changed in 1826 when Charlestown Township was split.

Chester County Archive road dockets indicate there was a Meeting House in 1802. The east (Worship) room was completed in 1816.

Schuylkill Friends Meeting for Worship is every Sunday at 10:00 am. It is part of the Caln Quarterly Meeting of the Philadelphia Yearly Meeting of the Religious Society of Friends.

References 

Further reading
• A Retrospect of Early Quakerism 1860 by Ezra Michener pg 62
• Schuylkill Friends Meeting Records of Philadelphia Yearly Meeting Deposited in Friends Historical Library of Swarthmore College & Haverford College Quaker Collection.
• Annals of Phoenixville and Its Vicinity 1872 by Samuel Whitaker Pennypacker
• Chester County Archives & Record Services

External links
• Official website
• Philadelphia Yearly Meeting
• Friends General Conference

19th-century Quaker meeting houses
Churches in Chester County, Pennsylvania
Churches on the Underground Railroad
Quaker meeting houses in Pennsylvania
Churches completed in 1807
Underground Railroad in Pennsylvania